Likino is a rural locality (a selo) in Andreyevskoye Rural Settlement, Sudogodsky District, Vladimir Oblast, Russia. The population was 724 as of 2010. There are 6 streets.

Geography 
Likino is located 15 km east of Sudogda (the district's administrative centre) by road. Tyurmerovka is the nearest rural locality.

References 

Rural localities in Sudogodsky District
Sudogodsky Uyezd